The 6th annual Berlin International Film Festival was held from 22 June to 3 July 1956.  The FIAPF granted the festival the "A status" during this year, which was previously only reserved for Cannes and Venice.  The awards for the first time, were given by an international jury.

The Golden Bear was awarded to Invitation to the Dance directed by Gene Kelly.  However, this decision by the jury was widely criticized as the fil was considered "too shallow" for a Golden Bear. The favourite among many critics was the Finnish entry Tuntematon sotilas by Edvin Laine, which was an anti-war film without any illusions based on a novel by Väinö Linna.

Jury
The following people were announced as being on the jury for the festival:

International feature film jury
 Marcel Carné, director and screenwriter (France) - Jury President
 Bill Luckwell, producer (United Kingdom)
 Giuseppe Vittorio Sampieri, director and producer (Italy)
 Kashiko Kawakita, special effects director (Japan)
 Leo J. Horster, entrepreneur (United States)
 Ilse Urbach, authoress (West Germany)
 Ludwig Berger, director and screenwriter (West Germany)

International documentary and short jury
 Otto Sonnenfeld, producer (Israel) - Jury President
 D. Gualberto Fernández, (Uruguay)
 Sarukkai Gopalan, (India)
 Jan Hulsker, art historian (Netherlands)
 Fritz Kempe, photographer (West Germany)

Films in competition
The following films were in competition for the Golden Bear awards:

Key

{| class="wikitable" width="550" colspan="1"
| style="background:#FFDEAD;" align="center"| †
|Winner of the main award for best film in its section
|}

Awards
The following prizes were awarded by the Jury:

International jury awards
 Golden Bear: Invitation to the Dance by Gene Kelly
 Silver Bear for Best Director: Robert Aldrich for Autumn Leaves
 Silver Bear for Best Actress: Elsa Martinelli for Donatella
 Silver Bear for Best Actor: Burt Lancaster for Trapeze
 Silver Bear for an Outstanding Artistic Contribution: André Michel for La Sorcière
 Silver Bear for an Outstanding Single Achievement: Charles Frend for The Long Arm
 Silver Bear: Richard III by Laurence Olivier
 Honourable Mention (Director): El camino de la vida by Alfonso Corona Blake
 Honourable Mention (Colour): Byaku fujin no yoren by Shirō Toyoda
 Honourable Mention (Best Humorous Film): Pane, amore e... by Dino Risi

Documentaries and short films jury awards
 Golden Bear (Documentaries): No Place for Wild Animals by Bernhard Grzimek and Michael Grzimek
 Silver Bear (Documentaries): The African Lion by James Algar
 Short Film Golden Bear: Paris la nuit by Jacques Baratier and Jean Valère
 Silver Bear for Best Short Film: ex aequoHitit güneşi by Sabahattin EyüboğluSpring Comes to Kashmir by Ravi PrakashRythmetic by Norman McLaren and Evelyn Lambart
 Honorable mention (Short Documentary or Cultural Film):...erwachsen sein dagegen sehr by Wolf HartLe Sabotier du Val de Loire by Jacques DemyThe Long Journey by Geoffrey Collings

Independent jury awards
 OCIC Award: Tuntematon sotilas by Edvin Laine
 OCIC Award, special mention: El camino de la vida by Alfonso Corona Blake

Audience vote
 Golden Bear: Vor Sonnenuntergang by Gottfried Reinhardt
 Silver Bear: Mi tío Jacinto by Ladislao Vajda
 Bronze Bear: Trapeze by Carol Reed

References

External links
 6th Berlin International Film Festival 1956
1956 Berlin International Film Festival
Berlin International Film Festival:1956  at Internet Movie Database

06
1956 film festivals
1956 in West Germany
1950s in Berlin